Shadowfall is the title of two separate novels:

 Shadowfall - Book one of the Godslayer Chronicles by James Clemens
 Shadowfall - Book twenty-six of the Deathlands series by Laurence James